The 1940 Delaware gubernatorial election was held on November 5, 1940. Incumbent Democratic Governor Richard McMullen originally ran for re-election to a second term, and was renominated by the Democratic Party. However, less than a month before the election, McMullen suffered a heart attack and he dropped out of the race. The state party named Secretary of State Josiah Marvel Jr., as McMullen's replacement on the ballot. On the Republican side, Wilmington Mayor Walter W. Bacon was nominated by the Republican Party for Governor.

Ultimately, even as President Franklin D. Roosevelt was handily winning Delaware en route to re-election nationwide, and as Democratic Senator James M. Tunnell was narrowly winning re-election, Bacon defeated Marvel by a decisive margin to regain the governorship for the Republican Party. Bacon received 52% of the vote to Marvel's 45%.

General election

References

1940
Delaware
Gubernatorial
November 1940 events